X-Motor Racing (XMR) is a motor racing game developed by the independent studio Exotypos in Russia and released in 2007.

Gameplay
XMR offers single player racing modes including Competition against AI, Hot Laps and Free Practice. Multiplayer features allows up to 32 players to practice, qualify or race together.

Developer features
Versions of the game offered for developers include a Software Development Kit that allows customisation of the physics model including tires, suspension, and motor behaviour, as well as allowing export of physics data for a motion platform, telemetry system or external control of the vehicles.

Reception
The game is only available from the developers' website and is not published or distributed through other channels. It has not been reviewed formally by publications and therefore has no Metacritic rating. A YouTube review from sim racing personality Jimmy Broadbent refers to the game as "The World's Worst Racing Simulator", citing its inconsistent handling model and lack of features compared to its contemporaries.

Prices 
XMR's price ranges from $15 to $2,250. The standard edition is available for $15, the Pro version is available for $350, the Ultimate version is available for $850, and the Enterprise version has the price of $2,250 dollars.

References

External links
Official X-Motor Racing site

2007 video games
Indie video games
Multiplayer and single-player video games
Racing simulators
Video games developed in Russia
Windows games
Windows-only games